Harrie is a given name. Notable people with the name include:

Harrie B. Chase (1889–1969), Judge of the United States Court of Appeals
Harrie Cross (1893–1958), Australian rules footballer
Harrie Dadmun, American football player
Harrie Geelen (born 1939), Dutch illustrator, film director, animator, translator, writer and poet
Harrie Gommans (born 1983), Dutch footballer
Harrie Irving Hancock (1868–1922), American chemist and juvenile writer
Harrie Hattam (1890–1947), Australian rules footballer
Harrie van Heumen (born 1959), Dutch ice hockey player
Harrie Jansen (born 1947), Dutch racing cyclist
Harrie Koorstra (1930–2004), Dutch sprint canoeist
Harrie Langman (1931–2016), Dutch VVD politician
Harrie Lavreysen (born 1997), Dutch track cyclist
Harrie T. Lindeberg (1879–1959), American architect
Harrie Massey (1908–1983), Australian mathematical physicist
Harrie Massey Medal and Prize
 (1879–1928), Dutch track cyclist
Harrie Mitchell (1906–1967), Australian politician
Harrie Seward (1884–1958), Australian politician
Harrie Skinner (1854–1936), Australian circus proprietor and founder of auto club
Harrie Smolders (born 1980), Dutch equestrian
Harrie Steevens (born 1945), Dutch racing cyclist
Harrie Vredenburg (born 1952), Dutch-born Canadian business academic
Harrie Wade OBE (1905–1964), Australian federal politician and minister
Harrie Wood (1831–1917), Australian miner and civil servant

See also
Lilla Harrie, locality situated in Skåne County, Sweden
Harald (disambiguation)
Harold (disambiguation)
Harry (disambiguation)

Dutch masculine given names

nl:Harrie